Megachile leucopyga is a species of bee in the family Megachilidae. It was described by Smith in 1853.

It has been collected in the Australian states of New South Wales and Tasmania

References

Leucopyga
Insects described in 1853